CLZ may refer to:

 Count leading zeros, a computer programming bit operation
 Calabozo Airport, Calabozo, Guárico, Venezuela
 Clonazepam, a medication used for seizure treatment